A glass lizard, or glass snake, is one of several lizard species belonging to the family Anguidae, so called because its tail easily breaks or snaps off. Glass lizards are native to North America, Europe, Asia, and North Africa. They originated in Europe and spread toward Asia after the drying of the Turgai Sea and then across Beringia to the North America region.

Not all lizards known as glass lizard belong to the same genus. The term "glass lizard" may refer to any of the following genera:

 Dopasia (7 species), native to eastern Asia
 Hyalosaurus  (1 species), native to North Africa
 Ophisaurus (6 species), native to eastern North America
 Pseudopus (1 extant species), native to Europe and Asia

References

Anguids